The Reverberation Appreciation Society is the creator, curator, and producer of annual psychedelic music festivals Levitation Austin, Levitation France, Levitation Chicago, and Levitation Vancouver. The Reverberation Appreciation Society's record label started in 2010, with the release of Christian Bland and the Revelators – The Lost Album. Later releases include albums by Joel Gion of The Brian Jonestown Massacre, Ringo Deathstarr, Wall of Death, Indian Jewelry, Golden Animals, Night Beats, Holy Wave, and The UFO Club (a collaboration between The Black Angels' Christian Bland and Night Beats' Lee Blackwell), as well as joint releases with Burger Records.

Roster
 Holy Wave
 Ringo Deathstarr
 Christian Bland & the Revelators
 Joel Gion
 Shapes Have Fangs
 Wall of Death
 The UFO Club
 Night Beats
 The Vacant Lots
 Indian Jewelry
 Elephant Stone
 Cosmonauts
 Al Lover
 Chris Catalena
 The Meek
 The Cult of Dom Keller
 Golden Animals

Discography
 RVRB 001 Christian Bland & the Revelators – The Lost Album
 RVRB 002 Shapes Have Fangs – Dinner in the Dark
 RVRB 003 The UFO Club / Night Beats – Split EP
 RVRB 004 Christian Bland and the Revelators – Pig Boat Blues
 RVRB 005 The Meek – Grave
 RVRB 006 The Vacant Lots – High and Low
 RVRB 007 The UFO Club – Self Titled
 RVRB 008 Cosmonauts – Laserbeam
 RVRB 009 Indian Jewelry – Peel It
 RVRB 010  Elephant Stone – Self Titled
 RVRB 011 Holy Wave – Evil Hits
 RVRB 012 Wall of Death – Main Obsession
 RVRB 013 Night Beats – Sonic Bloom
 RVRB 014 The Cult of Dom Keller – The Cult of Dom Keller
 RVRB 015 Golden Animals – Here Eye Go
 RVRB 016 Holy Wave – Relax
 RVRB 017 Joel Gion – Overthrow 7”
 RVRB 018 Joel Gion – Apple Bonkers
 RVRB 019 Christian Bland & The Revelators / Chris Catalena – Split EP
 RVRB 020 Christian Bland and the Revelators – The Unseen Green Obscene
 RVRB 021 Holy Wave – The Evil Has Landed Part II 
 RVRB 023 Al Lover – Zodiak Versions
 RVRB 024 Ringo Deathstarr – Pure Mood
 RVRB 025 Indian Jewelry – Doing Easy
 RVRB 026 Holy Wave – Freaks of Nurture
 RVRB 027 Various Artists – A Tribute To Pet Sounds
 RVRB 028 Holy Wave – Adult Fear
 RVRB 033 Frankie & The Witch Fingers - Monsters Eating People Eating Monsters...
 RVRB 037 Osees - Levitation Sessions
 RVRB 044 Fuzz - Levitation Sessions
 RVRB 050 Acid Dad - Take It From The Dead
 RVRB 051 Osees - Levitation Sessions II
 RVRB 052 King Gizzard & the Lizard Wizard - Live At Levitation

See also
 List of record labels

External links
 Official Website

References

Music of Austin, Texas
American independent record labels
Psychedelic rock record labels
American record labels